Joseph Lewis Thomas (July 24, 1909 – August 6, 1984) was an American swing jazz trumpeter, who was born in Webster Groves, Missouri, and died in New York City, New York.

Biography
He was born in Webster Groves, Missouri, United States, and started his music career at the age of 19 with bandleader Cecil Scott in 1928, and played throughout the Midwest before moving to New York in 1934, where he became one of the most sought-after trumpeters of the 1930s and 1940s. Those he worked with include Fletcher Henderson's Orchestra (1934–37), Fats Waller, Benny Carter (1939–40), Joe Sullivan and Teddy Wilson's Sextet (1942–43), Claude Hopkins and many others.
He featured in Art Kane's iconic 1958 photograph A Great Day in Harlem.

Discography
 Buck Clayton, How Hi the Fi (Columbia, 1954)
 Buck Clayton, Jumpin' at the Woodside (Columbia, 1955)
 Vic Dickenson & Joe Thomas, Mainstream (Atlantic, 1958)
 Coleman Hawkins, Coleman Hawkins All Stars (Swingville, 1960)
 Fletcher Henderson All Stars, The Big Reunion (Jazztone, 1958)
 Claude Hopkins, Let's Jam (Swingville, 1961)
 Rex Stewart, Henderson Homecoming (United Artists, 1959)
 Rex Stewart, Rex Stewart and the Ellingtonians (Riverside, 1960)

References

External links
 "Remembering Joe Thomas", Jazz Lives, June 11, 2009.
 "Soulful Elegance: Joe Thomas, trumpet", Jazz Lives, July 20, 2012.

1909 births
1984 deaths
American jazz trumpeters
American male trumpeters
Jazz musicians from Missouri
Swing trumpeters
20th-century American musicians
20th-century trumpeters
20th-century American male musicians
American male jazz musicians